Sir John Chetwode, 4th Baronet (11 May 1764 – 17 December 1845) was a British politician and baronet.

Born in Stockport, he was the only surviving son of Sir John Chetwode, 3rd Baronet and his wife Dorothy Bretland, third daughter of Thomas Bretland. In 1779, he succeeded his father as baronet. He entered the British House of Commons in 1815, sitting for Newcastle-under-Lyme until 1818. He represented Buckingham as Member of Parliament (MP) from 1841 until his death in 1845.

On 26 October 1785, he married firstly Lady Henrietta Grey, eldest daughter of George Grey, 5th Earl of Stamford in Dunham Massey. She died in 1826 and Chetwode married Elizabeth Bristow, daughter of John Bristow in 1827. He had seven daughters and eight sons by his first wife. Chetwode died, aged 82 at his residence in Bognor Regis and was buried in Mucklestone. He was succeeded in the baronetcy by his oldest son John.

References

External links

1764 births
1845 deaths
Baronets in the Baronetage of England
High Sheriffs of Cheshire
UK MPs 1812–1818
UK MPs 1841–1847
Members of the Parliament of the United Kingdom for Newcastle-under-Lyme
People from Stockport